Antonio Salamanca or Martinez de Salamanca (Salamanca 1479–1562 Rome) was a Spanish-born Italian dealer 
and publisher who settled in Rome and was active as a book-seller, publisher and engraver.

He was born in Salamanca, Spain in 1479 and seems to have settled in Rome, Italy, around 1510, when he married an Italian woman. It has been recorded that he was an active book-seller at the Campo de' Fiori of Rome in 1517 and that his publishing house flourished in 1526.

In 1532 he published his first collection of engravings with prints of mythological interest, including works by Raphael. Since 1553, he cooperated with Antonio Lafreri (1512–1577), a publisher and map trader of French origin, with whom he published a book of Juan Valverde de Amusco illustrated by Nicolas Beatrizet. His cooperation with Lafreri lasted until his death, for almost a decade, and produced engraved maps, prints and views of cities, as well as informative leaflets (avvisi) of important events of his time.

After his death, in 1562, his son Francesco Salamanca continued the cooperation with Antonio Lafreri.

Amongst his works is the creation of a copy of the first world map by Gerardus Mercator.

References

Spanish engravers
Italian engravers
Spanish cartographers
16th-century Italian cartographers
1479 births
1562 deaths
People from Salamanca